Thomas Banyacya, Sr. (June 2, 1909 – February 6,  1999) was a Hopi Native American traditional leader.

Biography 
Thomas Banyacya was born on June 2, 1909, and grew up in the village of Moenkopi, Arizona. He was a member of the Wolf, Fox, and Coyote clans. He first attended Sherman Indian School in Riverside, California and then Bacone College in Muskogee, Oklahoma. 

He lived in Kykotsmovi, Arizona on the Hopi Reservation. During World War II, Banyacya was a draft resister, who spent time in prison over seven years each time he refused to register for the draft. In 1948, he was one of four Hopis (the other were David Monongye, Dan Evehema, and Dan Katchongva) who were named by elders to reveal Hopi traditional wisdom and teachings, including the Hopi prophecies for the future, to the general public, after the atomic bombings of Hiroshima and Nagasaki in Japan. 

Banyacya died on February 6, 1999, in Keams Canyon, Arizona. He had been married to Fermina (née Jenkins).

See also

 Janet McCloud
 Hibakusha
 Uranium in the environment
 Anti-nuclear movement in the United States
 The Navajo People and Uranium Mining

References 

 http://banyacya.indigenousnative.org/preun92.html Banyaca's letter to Perez de Cuellar

External links 
 "Voice of Indigenous People – Native People Address the United Nations" Edited by Alexander Ewen, Clear Light Publishers, Santa Fe New Mexico, 1994, 176 pages. Thomas Banyacya et al. at the United Nations
 Native Americans in the twentieth century By James Stuart Olson, Raymond Wilson,VNR AG, 1984
 Remembering Thomas Banyacya
 Testimony/ Thomas Banyacya Sr., World Uranium Hearings, 14 September 1992, Salzburg
 Thomas Banyacya Hopi Traditional Elder
 Uranium Mining and Indigenous People

1999 deaths
Hopi people
Religious figures of the indigenous peoples of North America
Native American activists
Bacone College alumni
Indigenous peoples of North America articles needing expert attention
1909 births
Anti-uranium activists
20th-century Native Americans